Events from the year 1914 in the Netherlands

Incumbents 
 Monarch: Wilhelmina
 Prime Minister: Pieter Cort van der Linden

Establishments 

 VRA Amsterdam
 Ambachtsschool, Heerlen
 Bank Nederlandse Gemeenten
 Netherlands Naval Aviation Service

Disestablishments 

 RAP (football club)

Births 
 8 April – Hebe Charlotte Kohlbrugge, theologian (died 2016)
 23 July - Frits Jan Willem den Ouden, pilot (died 2012)
 26 October - Alfred Haighton, businessman and fascist leader (died 1943)
 20 September - Francis Steinmetz, Dutch military officer (died 2006)

Deaths
 1 April - Louise Sophie Blussé, writer, 95

References